Lists of artists, in the sense of people engaged in the visual arts, include lists by nationality, by location, by discipline, by period, by associated movement, by subject and by contribution.

Lists of artists by nationality

Algerian artists
American artists
Armenian artists
Australian artists
Austrian artists and architects
Azerbaijani artists
Bangladeshi artists
Barbadian artists
Belarusian artists
Belgium artists
Bosnian artists
Brazilian artists
British artists
Bulgarian artists
Burmese artists
Cambodian artists
Cameroonian artists
Canadian artists
Chilean artists
Chinese artists
Colombian artists
Croatian artists
Cuban artists
Cypriot painters
Czech artists
Dominican Republic artists
Dutch artists
Ecuadorian artists
Egyptian artists
French artists
German artists
Georgian artists
Greek artists
Greenlandic artists
Haitian artists
Icelandic painters
Indian artists
Indonesian artists
Iranian artists
Iraqi artists
Irish artists
Isle of Man artists
Israeli visual artists
Italian artists
Jamaican artists
Japanese artists
Kazakh artists
Kenyan artists
Korean artists
Latvian artists 
Lebanese artists
Lithuanian artists
Luxembourg artists
Macedonian artists
Maltese artists
Malaysian artists
Mexican artists
Moldovan artists
Mongolian artists
New Zealand artists
Northern Ireland artists
Norwegian artists
Pakistani artists
Peruvian artists
Polish artists
Portuguese artists
Russian artists
Scottish artists
Serbian artists
Slovakian painters
Slovenian artists
Spanish artists
South African artists
Syrian artists
Swedish artists
Trinidad and Tobago artists
Turkish artists
Ukrainian artists
Uruguayan artists
Venezuelan artists
Welsh artists

Lists of artists by location

 Aberdeen Artists Society
 Amsterdamse Joffers
 Boston Watercolor Club
Brooklyn artists
California Art Club
Cornish artists
Early Netherlandish painters
Glasgow Society of Lady Artists
Guernsey artists
Water Colour Society of Ireland
Art Students League of Los Angeles
Maine painters
Milanese painters
New England Watercolor Society
New Rochelle, New York artists
Art Students League of New York
New Zealand designers and artisans
Ontario Society of Artists
Portland, Oregon artists
San Pedro, California artists
Scandinavian textile artists
Utah artists
Venice painters and architects

Lists of artists by discipline

List of animators
List of avant-garde artists
List of calligraphers
List of caricaturists
List of cartoonists
List of comics creators
List of fashion designers
List of female comics creators
List of filmmakers
List of footwear designers
List of furniture designers
List of glass artists
List of grand couturiers
List of graphic designers
List of illustrators
List of industrial designers
List of interactive artists
List of jewellery designers
List of manga artists
List of mathematical artists
List of medallists
List of minicomics creators
List of minimalist artists
List of mixed media artists
List of modern artists
List of new media artists
List of Op artists
List of Orientalist artists
List of origamists
List of painters
List of performance artists
List of photographers
List of postminimalist artists
List of pin-up artists
List of photojournalists
List of poster artists
List of printmakers
List of quilters
List of role-playing game artists
List of sculptors
List of sound artists
List of stencil artists
List of stop motion artists
List of street artists
List of street photographers
List of Stuckist artists
List of studio potters
List of tattoo artists
List of type designers
List of video artists
List of watchmakers
List of webcomic creators
List of women photographers
List of woodcarvers
List of Yakshagana artists

List of artists by period
Artists of the Tudor court
List of 18th-century British children's literature illustrators
List of 19th-century British children's literature illustrators
List of early-20th-century British children's literature illustrators
List of 19th-century Russian painters
List of 20th-century Russian painters
List of American artists before 1900
List of American artists 1900 and after
List of contemporary artists
List of Federal Art Projects artists
List of Gothic artists
List of Greek vase painters
List of feminist avant-garde artists of the 1970s
List of modern artists
List of Romanesque artists
List of Stone Age art

Lists of artists by associated movement
British Surrealist Group
List of Dadaists
List of feminist artists
List of French artistic movements
List of Hudson River School artists
List of Indigenous Australian art movements and cooperatives
List of Nihonga painters
List of Orientalist artists
List of Russian Avant-Garde artists
List of Yōga painters
Lyrical abstraction
Women surrealists
Young British Artists

List of artists by teacher 

 Students of Thomas Eakins
List of Carlo Maratta pupils and assistants
 List of pupils of Jean-Léon Gérôme
 List of Rembrandt pupils
List of Utagawa school members

List of artists by alma mater 

 Byam Shaw School of Art alumni
 Courtauld Institute of Art alumni
 Julian Ashton Art School alumni
 Royal College of Art alumni
 Sir Jamsetjee Jeejebhoy School of Art alumni
 Slade School of Fine Art alumni
 St. Martin's School of Art alumni

Lists of artists by subject
List of American botanical illustrators
List of Australian botanical illustrators
List of Australian street artists
List of BDSM artists
List of BDSM photographers
List of artists focused on the female form
List of fetish artists
List of Glitch Artists
List of artists who painted Hawaii and its people
List of artists who made prints of Hawaii and its people
List of artists who sculpted Hawaii and its people
List of Irish botanical illustrators
List of mathematical artists
List of photographers of the civil rights movement
List of science fiction and fantasy artists
List of Soviet poster artists
List of space artists
List of wildlife artists

List of artists by contribution
List of artists in the Armory Show
List of artists in the Web Gallery of Art
List of notable artists who have exhibited in Artomatic
List of artists in the collection of the Mauritshuis
List of artists who have created a Château Mouton Rothschild label
List of artists from the MNAC collection
List of artists in the Leuchtenberg Gallery
List of artworks on stamps of the United States
List of painters in the Art Institute of Chicago
List of painters in the Los Angeles County Museum of Art collections
List of painters in the National Gallery of Art
List of painters in the Pinakothek
List of painters in the collection of the Rijksmuseum
List of painters of Saint Petersburg Union of Artists
List of Académie des Beaux-Arts members: Painting
List of New Museum Triennial Artists
List of Vanity Fair artists
List of artists represented in the National Museum of Western Art, Tokyo
List of artists who created paintings and drawings for use in films
List of members of the American Academy of Arts and Letters Department of Art
American Academy of Arts and Letters
Biennial of Hawaii Artists
List of New Museum Triennial Artists
Folio Society
Art collection of Fondazione Cariplo
Art collection of Fondazione Cassa di Risparmio di Cesena
Art collection of Fondazione Cassa di Risparmio di Lucca
Art collection of Fondazione Cassa di Risparmio di Perugia
Art collection of Fondazione Manodori
Catalog of paintings in the Louvre Museum
Catalog of paintings in the National Gallery, London
List of paintings on Soviet postage stamps
List of artists who painted United States post office murals
List of Lynx public art artists

Lists of artists by exhibition they were featured in 

 List of women artists exhibited at the 1893 World's Columbian Exposition
 List of American painters exhibited at the 1893 World's Columbian Exposition
 List of American sculptors exhibited at the 1893 World's Columbian Exposition
 List of Whitney Biennial artists
Catalog of Still life paintings from the Netherlands, 1550-1720
Catalog of Pride and Joy: Children's Portraits in The Netherlands 1500-1700
 Women Artists: 1550-1950

List of artists by franchise 

List of Magic: The Gathering artists
List of Star Wars artists

List of artists by awards won 

 Abd-el-Tif prize
 List of fellows of the American Academy in Rome 1896–1970
 List of fellows of the American Academy in Rome 1971–1990
 List of fellows of the American Academy in Rome 1991–2010
 List of fellows of the American Academy in Rome 2011–present
 List of Archibald Prize 1921 finalists
 List of Archibald Prize 1922 finalists
 List of Archibald Prize 1923 finalists
 List of Archibald Prize 1938 finalists
 List of Archibald Prize 1946 finalists
 List of Archibald Prize 1960 finalists
 List of Archibald Prize 1973 finalists
 List of Archibald Prize 1986 finalists
 List of Archibald Prize 1990 finalists
 List of Archibald Prize 1993 finalists
 List of Archibald Prize 1994 finalists
 List of Archibald Prize 1995 finalists
 List of Archibald Prize 1996 finalists
 List of Archibald Prize 1997 finalists
 List of Archibald Prize 1998 finalists
 List of Archibald Prize 1999 finalists
 List of Archibald Prize 2000 finalists
 List of Archibald Prize 2001 finalists
 List of Archibald Prize 2002 finalists
 List of Archibald Prize 2003 finalists
 List of Archibald Prize 2004 finalists
 List of Archibald Prize 2005 finalists
 List of Archibald Prize 2006 finalists
 List of Archibald Prize 2007 finalists
 List of Archibald Prize 2008 finalists
 List of Archibald Prize 2009 finalists
 List of Archibald Prize 2010 finalists
 List of Archibald Prize 2011 finalists
 List of Archibald Prize 2012 finalists
 List of Archibald Prize 2013 finalists
 List of Archibald Prize 2014 finalists
 List of Archibald Prize 2015 finalists
 List of Archibald Prize 2016 finalists
 List of Archibald Prize 2017 finalists
 List of Archibald Prize 2018 finalists
 List of Archibald Prize 2019 finalists
 List of Archibald Prize winners
 Lists of Archibald Prize finalists
 Anne Gould Hauberg Artist Images Award
 Ars Fennica Award
 Art Prize of the German Democratic Republic
 Bennett Prize for Women Figurative Realists
 Bonnie Bronson Fellowship
 Carnegie Prize
 Catharine E. B. Cox Award for Excellence in the Visual Arts
 Cherry Kearton Medal and Award
 Chesley Awards
 Cologne Fine Art Award
 Cresson Traveling Scholarship
 Leonardo da Vinci World Award of Arts
 Dorothea von Stetten Art Award
 Prix Fénéon
 Future Generation Art Prize
 Prix Godecharle
 Guggenheim International Award
List of Hallgarten Prize-winning painters
 Imke Folkerts Prize for Fine Arts
 Jindřich Chalupecký Award
 Kazimierz Ostrowski Award
 List of Laureates of the Governor General's Award in Visual and Media Arts
List of Lulu Award winners
 Logan Medal of the Arts
 National Prize for Plastic Arts (Chile)
 National Award for Plastic Arts (Spain)
 List of NATSIAA award winners
 List of Olympic medalists in art competitions
 Ordway Prize
 Prince Eugen Medal
 Prix Blumenthal
 Prix de Rome (Belgium)
 Prix Fondation d'entreprise Ricard
 Prix Grand-Duc Adolphe
 Sheikha Manal's Young Artist Award
 Szpilman Award
Temple Gold Medal
 Through Art – to Peace and Understanding
 William Hodges Fellowship
 Women's Caucus for Art Lifetime Achievement Award
 World Fantasy Award—Artist
 Wynn Newhouse Award

Lists of artists by book they are listed in 

120 Paintings from the Rijksmuseum
Artists in biographies by Giovanni Baglione
 Artists in biographies by Filippo Baldinucci
 Benezit Dictionary of Artists
English Female Artists
 The Great Theatre of Dutch Painters
 Great Women Masters of Art
 Het Gulden Cabinet
Invisible Women: Forgotten Artists of Florence
 Lives of Flemish, German, and Dutch painters
Lives of the Most Excellent Painters, Sculptors, and Architects
List of artists in the Metropolitan Museum of Art Guide
List of artists in the Philadelphia Museum of Art handbook of the collections
 Schilder-boeck
 An account of the lives and works of the most eminent Spanish painters, sculptors and architects
 Roger de Piles' artists from France
 Roger de Piles' artists from Germany and the Low Countries
 Roger de Piles' artists from Lombardy
 Teutsche Academie
 Geschiedenis der Vaderlandsche Schilderkunst
 Lives of the Most Excellent Painters, Sculptors, and Architects
 The Lives of Dutch painters and paintresses

Lists of artists by organization they belong to 

Société des Artistes Français
List of members of Aosdána
Berlin Secession
List of artists associated with The London Group
List of presidents of The London Group
List of members of the Académie Royale de Peinture et de Sculpture
National Association of Women Artists
National Cartoonist Society
National Society of Mural Painters
Royal Birmingham Society of Artists
Royal Institute of Painters in Water Colours
List of painters of Saint Petersburg Union of Artists
Vienna Secession

Other
African-American architects
List of African-American visual artists
List of American architects
Arti et Amicitiae
List of artists featured on the show 100 Great Paintings
List of artists who created paintings and drawings for use in films
List of Black British artists
List of Canadian women artists
List of Catholic artists
List of centenarians (artists, painters and sculptors)
List of English women artists
List of French stained glass manufacturers
List of Indigenous Australian visual artists
List of Jewish American cartoonists
List of Korean ceramic artists and sculptors
List of Latin American artists
List of LGBT artists
List of Muslim painters
List of Native American artists
List of Native American artists from Oklahoma
List of Native American women artists
List of outsider artists
List of painters by name
List of Russian landscape painters
List of Scottish women artists
List of women artists from Bangladesh
Lists of women artists
List of Azerbaijani sculptors
List of Croatian sculptors
List of Danish sculptors
List of Hungarian sculptors
List of Latvian sculptors
List of Polish sculptors
List of Slovenian sculptors
List of Scandinavian textile artists

See also
Lists of painters by nationality